Karimabad-e Hajj Ali (also Romanized as Karīmābād-e Ḩājj ‘Alī; also known as Karīmābād-e Ḩājī ‘Alī and Karīmābād-e Ḩājjī ‘Alī) is a village in Mahan Rural District, Mahan District, Kerman County, Kerman Province, Iran. At the 2006 census, its population was 29, in 7 families.

References 

Populated places in Kerman County